Peponium is a genus of flowering plants belonging to the family Cucurbitaceae.

Its native range is Tropical and Southern Africa, and Western Indian Ocean.

Species
Species:

Peponium betsiliense 
Peponium boivinii 
Peponium caledonicum 
Peponium chirindense 
Peponium cienkowskii 
Peponium grandidieri 
Peponium hirtellum 
Peponium humbertii 
Peponium laceratum 
Peponium lagenarioides 
Peponium leucanthum 
Peponium mackenii 
Peponium pageanum 
Peponium perrieri 
Peponium poissonii 
Peponium racemosum 
Peponium seyrigii 
Peponium sublitorale 
Peponium vogelii

References

Cucurbitaceae
Cucurbitaceae genera